The 2005 LPGA Tour was a series of weekly golf tournaments for elite female golfers from around the world which took place from February through December 2005. The tournaments were sanctioned by the United States-based Ladies Professional Golf Association (LPGA). Total prize money for all tournaments was $45,100,000.

Annika Sörenstam dominated the Tour in 2005, winning ten tournaments, including two of the four major tournaments, winning more than $2 million in prize money for the fifth consecutive season. Five other players earned over $1 million. Players from South Korea continued to be a growing force on the Tour, with seven different Korean players winning tournaments, including the two majors not won by Sörenstam: Birdie Kim at the U.S. Women's Open and Jeong Jang at the Women's British Open

For details of what happened in the main tournaments of the year see 2005 in golf.

Tournament schedule and results
The number in parentheses after winners' names show the player's total number of official money, individual event wins on the LPGA Tour including that event.

Tournaments in bold are majors.

Leaders
Money List leaders

Full 2005 Official Money List

Scoring Average leaders

Full 2005 Scoring Average List - navigate to "2005", then "Scoring Average"

Award winners
The three competitive awards given out by the LPGA each year are:
The Rolex Player of the Year is awarded based on a formula in which points are awarded for top-10 finishes and are doubled at the LPGA's four major championships. The points system is: 30 points for first; 12 points for second; nine points for third; seven points for fourth; six points for fifth; five points for sixth; four points for seventh; three points for eighth; two points for ninth and one point for 10th.
2005 Winner: Annika Sörenstam. Runner-up: Paula Creamer
The Vare Trophy, named for Glenna Collett-Vare, is given to the player with the lowest scoring average for the season.
2005 Winner: Annika Sörenstam. Runner-up: Cristie Kerr
The Louis Suggs Rolex Rooke of the Year Award is awarded to the first-year player on the LPGA Tour who scores the highest in a points competition in which points are awarded at all full-field domestic events and doubled at the LPGA's four major championships. The points system is: 150 points for first; 80 points for second; 75 points for third; 70 points for fourth; and 65 points for fifth. After fifth place, points are awarded in increments of three, beginning at sixth place with 62 points. Rookies who make the cut in an event and finish below 41st each receive five points.  The award is named after Louise Suggs, one of the founders of the LPGA.
2005 Winner: Paula Creamer. Runner-up: Meena Lee

See also
2005 in golf

External links
LPGA official website

LPGA Tour seasons
LPGA Tour